This is a comprehensive list of different parts for body piercing.

Ear piercings
Daith piercing
Vertical helix piercing
Earlobe piercing(s)
Helix piercing
Forward helix piercing
Rook
Snug
Tragus piercing
Industrial piercing
Flat/Outer Conch piercing
Surface Tragus piercing
Transverse lobe piercing
Dermal Punch
Stretched lobe(s)
Conch
Orbital
Double helix piercing
stacked lobe
auricle piercing
anti-tragus piercing
upper lobe
Ear Weaving Piercing
lower helix

Nose piercings
 Nostril piercing
High nostril piercing
Nasallang piercing(s)
Septum piercing
Bridge piercing(s)
Septril piercing(s)
Rhino piercing
Austin bar piercing
Multiple Nostril Piercing
septril piercing
Third-eye piercing

Facial piercings
Anti-eyebrow
dimple piercing
Cheek piercing
Eyebrow piercing
Horizontal eyebrow piercing
Mandible piercing(s)
teardrop piercings
eyebrow piercing
horizontal eyebrow piercing
crows feet piercing
butterfly kiss piercing
Diver dermal

Lip piercings 

Jestrum piercing
Labret piercing
Snakebites
Medusa/philtrum piercing
Dahlias
Canine bites
Angel bites
Cyber bites
Spider bites
Madonna piercing
Monroe piercing
Lateral labret
Vertical labret
Dolphin bites
Horizontal lip piercing
Ashley piercing
k9 piercing
Shark bites

Tongue piercings 

Tongue piercing
Horizontal tongue piercing
Inverse tongue piercing
Frenulum piercing
Frowny piercing
Smiley piercings

Genital piercings

Male 

Ampallang
Dydoe
Foreskin piercing
Frenum piercing
Hafada piercing
Lorum piercing
Prince Albert and Reverse Prince Albert
Jacob's Ladder Piercing

Female 
 Christina piercing 
 Clitoral hood piercing
 Clitoris piercing
 Fourchette piercings
 Isabella piercing
 Labia piercing
 Nefertiti piercing
 Princess Albertina piercing
 Triangle piercing

Other parts
 Collarbone piercing
 Corset piercing
 Dermals (anywhere)
 Hip piercing
 Nape piercing
 Navel piercing
 Nipple piercing
Inverse Navel Piercing
tooth piercing
Wrist piercing

References

 
Body piercing jewellery
Ear piercing
Facial piercings
Fashion-related lists
Genital piercings